Koi no Jubaku (恋の呪縛) (Love's Spell) is the fifth single by Berryz Kobo. It was released on November 10, 2004.

The single entered the Oricon Daily Singles Chart at number 6.

Details 
 Main vocalists: Miyabi Natsuyaki, Momoko Tsugunaga, Risako Sugaya (center), Yurina Kumai

Track listing 
  (Music and lyrics: Tsunku. Arrangement: Hirata Shouichirou)
  (Music and lyrics: Tsunku. Arrangement: Hirata Shouichirou)
 "Koi no Jubaku" (Instrumental)

PV versions 
 Normal PV
 Smile Ver. (スマイル Ver.)

References

External links 
 Koi no Jubaku entry on the Up-Front Works official website

2004 singles
Songs written by Tsunku
Berryz Kobo songs
Song recordings produced by Tsunku
2004 songs
Piccolo Town singles
Torch songs
Techno songs